The first season of the Case Closed anime was directed by Kenji Kodama. It was produced by TMS Entertainment in cooperation with Yomiuri Telecasting Corporation. The series is based on Gosho Aoyama's Case Closed manga series. In Japan, the manga series is titled  but Case Closed was adopted for the anime version to avoid legal issues. The series' plot is based on the adventures of a teenage detective Jimmy Kudo, reverted to childhood through a poisoning.

The season premiered from January 8, 1996, through August 12, 1996, on Nippon Television Network System in Japan. Episodes one through twenty-eight are collected in a seven DVD compilation produced by Shogakukan and released in Japan between the twenty-second and twenty-fourth of February 2006. The first season was then licensed and dubbed by Funimation Entertainment for release in English speaking countries. Case Closed was aired on Cartoon Network's Adult Swim programming block and on Canada's YTV station. The English adaption was collected and released on a four DVD compilations between February 21, 2006, and September 19, 2006. The English adaption of season one was later released in a DVD boxset by Funimation on July 22, 2008, and contained the first twenty-six episodes, or twenty-five according to the Japanese numbering system. The season one DVD boxset Viridian edition was released on July 14, 2009. For the fifteenth anniversary of the anime series, the episodes were made available for video on demand in Japan.

In total the first-season episodes use five distinct theme songs: one opening and two closing in the Japanese episodes versus one opening and one closing in the English versions. The first ending theme for the Japanese version is "Step by Step" by Ziggy and was used through episode twenty-six. The remaining episodes use  by Heath as their ending song. The English opening theme song is "Mune ga Doki Doki" with English lyrics and renamed "First New Century". The English ending theme is "Step by Step" with English lyrics. Both theme songs are arranged and sung by Carl Finch. In April 2009, when the first two episodes were re-aired in Japan the music was changed to "Everlasting Luv" by Breakerz for the opening and "Doing all Right" by Garnet Crow for the closing song.



Episode list

Notes

 The episode's numbering as followed in Japan
 The episode's numbering as followed by Funimation Entertainment
 The episodes were aired as a single hour long episode in Japan
 These episodes are part of the second season of Case Closed

References
General

Specific

1996 Japanese television seasons
Season 1